The 2012 National Basketball League All-Star Game was held at the 8,000 seat Adelaide Arena in Adelaide, South Australia on 22 December 2012. The game was won by the South All-Stars,  134 points to the North All-Stars 114. Melbourne Tigers shooting guard Chris Goulding electrified the 4,523 in attendance, scoring 24 points (including several Slam dunks), grabbing 5 rebounds and handing out 4 assists on his way to winning the game's MVP award. The game was broadcast on Network Ten in Australia and it was the first NBL All-Star Game since 2007/08.

The game was played between the South All-Stars – represented by players from the Adelaide 36ers, Melbourne Tigers, New Zealand Breakers and Perth Wildcats – and the North All-Stars – represented by players from the Cairns Taipans, Sydney Kings, Townsville Crocodiles and Wollongong Hawks. Starters from both teams were announced on 6 December 2012, while the reserves were named on 13 December. Australian basketball fans selected both starting lineups via the NBL website while the NBL selected the reserves.

As the game was played in Adelaide, the South All-Stars was designated the "home" team and were coached by dual and reigning NBL championship winning coach, Andrej Lemanis of the New Zealand Breakers, whilst the North All-Stars were coached by Wollongong Hawks head coach Gordie McLeod. The coaches were decided upon due to the Breakers and Hawks having the best records of the teams representing the North and South following Round 9 of the 2012–13 NBL season. NBL Hall of Fame members Mark Davis (South) and Cal Bruton (North) were named as the assistant coaches.

Line-up

South All-Stars
Head Coach: Andrej Lemanis (New Zealand Breakers)
Assistant Coach: Mark Davis

Starters

*Daniel Johnson was selected as a starter for the South Stars after Perth Wildcats centre Matthew Knight was ruled out with a torn calf muscle.
*Jonny Flynn was selected as a starter for the South Stars after Perth Wildcats guard Kevin Lisch was ruled out with a groin injury.

Reserves

*Jason Cadee was added to the South Stars bench after starter Kevin Lisch withdrew with injury and was replaced as a starter by Jonny Flynn.
*Stephen Weigh was added to the South Stars bench after Anthony Petrie withdrew with a back injury.

North All-Stars
Head Coach: Gordie McLeod (Wollongong Hawks)
Assistant Coach: Cal Bruton

Starters

Reserves

*Peter Crawford was added to the North All-Stars bench after Sydney Kings centre Ian Crosswhite withdrew with an ankle injury.
*Jamar Wilson was added to the North All-Stars bench after Sydney Kings guard Corin Henry was forced to withdraw after collapsing at a Kings practice and being taken to hospital.

Boxscore
Starters marked with a *

South All-Stars

North All-Stars

Game data

Venue: Adelaide Arena
Attendance: 4,523
MVP: Chris Goulding (South)
Television: Network Ten
Announce Team: Steve Carfino, Andrew Gaze and Brett Maher
Sideline Interviewer: Ian Shuttleworth

Slam Dunk Competition
The Slam Dunk Competition was contested by the following players:

 Thomas Abercrombie (New Zealand Breakers)
 Lance Hurdle (Wollongong Hawks)
 Darnell Lazare (Sydney Kings)
 Lucas Walker (Melbourne Tigers)
 Bennie Lewis (Melbourne Tigers)

Mitch Creek (Adelaide 36ers) was originally selected to take part in the competition but suffered a ruptured Achilles tendon on 15 December against the Townsville Crocodiles. 36ers team mate Pero Vasiljevic who originally named as the reserve but has declined to take part. The NBL called up Bennie Lewis (Melbourne Tigers) as the replacement after an extensive social media campaign by Tigers fans.

Bennie Lewis was the eventual winner.

3 Point Shootout
In 2012 the 3-Point Shootout made its return to the NBL All-Star day. It was fought out between the following 5 players:

 Peter Crawford (Townsville Crocodiles)
 Oscar Forman (Wollongong Hawks)
 Lance Hurdle (Wollongong Hawks)
 Ben Madgen (Sydney Kings)
 Stephen Weigh (Adelaide 36ers)

Stephen Weigh was the eventual winner.

See also
NBL All-Star Game (Australia)
National Basketball League (Australasia)
2012–13 NBL season

External links
 Official site of the NBL
 2012–13 NBL All-Stars
 All-Star Game: Fast-starting South claim All-Star crown
 NBL Wiki Game Profile

References

2012
Sports competitions in Adelaide
All-Star Game